Amédée Thubé (8 December 1884 – 29 January 1941) was a French sailor who competed in the 1912 Summer Olympics. He was part of the French boat Mac Miche, which won the gold medal in the 6 metre class.

References

External links
 

1884 births
1941 deaths
French male sailors (sport)
Olympic sailors of France
Olympic gold medalists for France
Olympic medalists in sailing
Medalists at the 1912 Summer Olympics
Sailors at the 1912 Summer Olympics – 6 Metre